Hüther, Huether or Huther (German: occupational name for a herdsman, field guard or guardian Middle High German hüetære) is a German-language surname. It may refer to:
Bruce Huther (born 1954), former American football linebacker
Gerald Hüther (born 1951), German neurobiologist
Gordon Huether (born 1959), German-American artist
Mc Moordy King Hüther (born 1999), German footballer
Michael Hüther (born 1962), German economist
Mike Huether (born 1962), American philanthropist and politician from South Dakota

References 

Occupational surnames
German-language surnames